The National Football League Competition Committee was created in 1968 following the announcement of the AFL-NFL merger.  It replaced the NFL Rules Committee, which was formed in 1932 when the NFL adopted its own rulebook.  Prior to 1932 the NFL used the college rulebook.  

Members of the Competition Committee are chosen by the NFL commissioner.  The members are:  

 Rich McKay (chairman) – president, Atlanta Falcons
 Katie Blackburn – executive vice president, Cincinnati Bengals
 Chris Grier – general manager, Miami Dolphins
 Stephen Jones – executive vice president, Dallas Cowboys
 John Mara – owner, New York Giants
 Ozzie Newsome – executive vice president, Baltimore Ravens
 Frank Reich – head coach, Carolina Panthers
 Ron Rivera – head coach, Washington Commanders
 Mike Tomlin – head coach, Pittsburgh Steelers
 Mike Vrabel – head coach, Tennessee Titans

References

External links
 NFL Football Operations: The NFL Competition Committee
 Saints' Sean Payton named to NFL's competition committee

Competition